Hasbrouck Park is a  park in Kingston, New York or in Kingston (town), New York

Opened in 1920, it was Kingston's first "official" downtown park.  

Much of the park's area was mined by the Neward Lime and Cement Company in the 1800s and early 1900s. That company's Stone Building, built in 1919 and renamed the Emilio Primo Stone Building in 1999, is used for events and recreation programs.

In 2019, a college student was killed by a  fall, at night, in Hasbrouck Park, Kingston.

References

Parks in Ulster County, New York
Kingston, New York